Vincas Mickevičius was the birth name of two notable Lithuanians:

 Vincas Krėvė-Mickevičius (1882–1954), writer
 Vincas Mickevičius-Kapsukas (1880–1935), communist activist